A ministry of women or women's affairs exists in several countries under various names, often headed by a minister for women (or equivalent):

 Ministry of Women's Affairs (Afghanistan)
 Ministry of Women, Genders and Diversity (Argentina)
 Ministry of Women's Affairs (Cambodia)
 National Women's Service (Chile)
 Minister for Gender Equality (Denmark)
 Ministry of Women's Affairs (France)
 Federal Ministry of Family Affairs, Senior Citizens, Women and Youth (Germany)
 Ministry of Women and Children's Affairs (Ghana)
 Ministry of Women and Child Development (India)
 Ministry of Women Empowerment and Child Protection (Indonesia)
 Ministry of Women, Youth, Sports and Social Affairs (Kiribati)
 Ministry of Women, Family and Community Development (Malaysia)
 Ministry of Women, Children and Social Welfare (Nepal)
 Ministry for Women (New Zealand)
 Minister of Women's Affairs (Nigeria)
 Ministry of Women and Vulnerable Populations (Peru)
 Ministry of Women and Family (여성가족부) (South Korea)
 Ministry of Women's Affairs (Sri Lanka)
 Ministry of Integration and Gender Equality (Sweden)
 Ministry of Gender, Labour and Social Development (Uganda)
 Ministry of Gender (Zambia)
 Ministry of Women's Affairs, Gender and Community Development (Zimbabwe)